Vladimir Belov may refer to:
 Vladimir Belov (pianist) (1906–1989), Russian pianist and teacher
 Vladimir Belov (speed skater) (born 1954), Russian speedskater, #1 on the Adelskalender in 1978–79
 Vladimir Belov (soldier) (born 1955), Russian lieutenant-colonel and Hero of Russia
 Vladimir Belov (handballer) (1958–2016), Russian handball player
 Vladimir Belov (chess player) (born 1984), Russian chess grandmaster
 Vladimir Belov (serial killer) (born 1972), Soviet-Russian brigand and serial killer
 See also 
 Belov, surname